Lassaad Abdelli (born 18 September 1960) is a former Tunisian international footballer. He is the father of current professional footballer Youssef Abdelli.

Career statistics

Club

Notes

References

1960 births
Living people
Tunisian footballers
Association football forwards
Club Africain players
K. Berchem Sport players
Alemannia Aachen players
2. Bundesliga players